"Paradise" is a song by French DJ duo Ofenbach featuring vocals by Swedish singer Benjamin Ingrosso. The song was released on 24 August 2018.

Music video
A music video to accompany the release of "Paradise" was directed by Alejo Restrepo and released on 28 September 2018.

Track listing

Charts

Weekly charts

Year-end charts

Certifications

Release history

References

2018 singles
2018 songs
Benjamin Ingrosso songs
Ofenbach (DJs) songs
Songs written by Benjamin Ingrosso
Songs written by Hampus Lindvall